Mary Harney (born 11 March 1953) is an Irish former politician and the current Chancellor of the University of Limerick.

She was leader of the Progressive Democrats party between 1993 and 2006 and again from 2007 to 2008, resuming the role after her successor, Michael McDowell, lost his seat at the 2007 general election. She is the longest-ever-serving female member of Dáil Éireann, serving as a Teachta Dála (TD) successively for the Dublin South-West and Dublin Mid-West constituencies from 1981 to 2011.

She was Ireland's first female Tánaiste from 1997 to 2006, and the first woman to lead a party in Dáil Éireann.

Early life and education
Harney was born in Portiuncula Hospital, Ballinasloe, County Galway, in 1953. Her parents, who lived in nearby Ahascragh, were both farmers, but shortly after her birth her family moved to Newcastle, County Dublin. She was educated at the Convent of Mercy, Inchicore, and Presentation Convent, Clondalkin, before studying at Trinity College Dublin.

During her time in Trinity, she became the first female auditor (chair) of the College Historical Society. In 1976, she graduated with a third-class Bachelor of Arts in Economic and Social Studies, and for a brief time was a secondary school teacher at Castleknock College in Dublin.

Political career: 1977–2011

Fianna Fáil: 1977–1985
Harney came to the attention of Fianna Fáil leader Jack Lynch, and stood unsuccessfully as a Fianna Fáil candidate in the 1977 general election. She was then appointed to Seanad Éireann by Lynch who had become Taoiseach. She was the youngest ever member of the Seanad when appointed, aged 24.

In 1979, Harney had her first electoral success when she was elected to Dublin County Council. Two years later she was elected to the Dáil at the 1981 general election for Dublin South-West. She retained her seat at every election until her retirement in 2011, moving to the new Dublin Mid-West constituency at the 2002 general election when it was created from part of Dublin South-West.

After the killers of gay man Declan Flynn received suspended sentences, Harney challenged then Minister for Justice Michael Noonan to seek the resignation of the judge.

As a member of the so-called Gang of 22, she was expelled from the party after voting in favour of the Anglo-Irish Agreement in 1985.

Foundation of Progressive Democrats: 1985–1997
Harney went on to become a founder member of the Progressive Democrats with Desmond O'Malley and Bobby Molloy in December 1985.

Following the 1989 general election the Progressive Democrats entered into a coalition government with Fianna Fáil, led at the time by Charles Haughey. Harney was appointed Minister of State with responsibility for Environmental Protection. As Minister of State she championed legislation to ban the sale of bituminous coal in Dublin, thereby eliminating smog from the city. She served in this position until the party withdrew from government in late 1992. In February 1993, Harney was appointed Deputy Leader of the Progressive Democrats, and succeeded O'Malley as party Leader in October of that year, making her the first female leader of an Irish political party in Dáil Eireann.

Entering coalition with Fianna Fáil again: 1997–2004
Following the 1997 general election and lengthy negotiations, the Progressive Democrats entered into coalition government with Fianna Fáil. Harney was appointed the first female Tánaiste and Minister for Enterprise, Trade and Employment. Harney used her powers to initiate thirteen investigations into companies which tribunals had suggested might have breached company law. After the 2002 general election Harney led the Progressive Democrats, who had doubled their seats from four to eight, back into coalition with Fianna Fáil, the first time a government had been re-elected since 1969. She was re-appointed Tánaiste and Minister for Enterprise, Trade and Employment. She inaugurated the Personal Injuries Assessment Board (PIAB) in May 2004, to reduce high litigation costs in personal injuries cases and to compensate claimants quickly and cheaply. This was a major reform of the insurance market long opposed by the legal profession.

Harney was Ireland's representative to the European Council of Ministers for the Software Patents Directive. Because the Council's first reading fell during the Irish Presidency of the European Council, she was chair of the meeting that discarded the amendments by the European Parliament which confirmed the exclusion of software innovations from what constitutes patentable subject matter.

In December 2001, Harney controversially used an Air Corps aircraft to travel to County Leitrim to open a friend's off-licence in Manorhamilton; the trip cost €1,500. Harney later apologised for having abused her position in using the plane for non-government business, and admitted that using the plane was wrong. The aircraft was to be used 90% of the time exclusively for maritime surveillance.

Minister for Health and Children: 2004–2011
In a government reshuffle on 29 September 2004, Harney was appointed Minister for Health and Children.

In May 2006, the Irish Nurses Organisation unanimously passed a motion of no confidence in Mary Harney, accusing her of being negative and antagonistic towards nurses. Her policy of transferring private beds in public hospitals to privately operated hospitals also attracted criticism.

In March 2006, 16 months after she took office as health minister, the INO claimed that a record number of 455 people were waiting on hospital trolleys on one day (although the Health Service Executive gave a figure of 363 people waiting on hospital trolleys for the same day). In June 2006 the Health Consumer Powerhouse ranked the Irish health service as the second-least-"consumer-friendly" in the European Union and Switzerland, coming 25th out of 26 countries, ahead of only Lithuania. However, when the same survey was conducted a year later, the Irish health service showed significant improvement, coming 16th out of 29 countries, even scoring higher than Britain's NHS, which came 17th in the survey.

In July 2006, Ireland on Sunday reported that Mary Harney's mother, Mrs Sarah Harney, jumped a queue of two emergency cases to receive hip surgery at The Adelaide and Meath Hospital in Tallaght. The allegation was strongly denied by the minister. Sixty percent of respondents to a The Irish Times/TNS mrbi poll in December 2006 said that the appointment of Harney to the position of Minister for Health had not led to any improvement in the health service. Fine Gael, the Labour Party and Harney's own Progressive Democrats supporters were those who expressed most satisfaction, with people in Dublin also feeling most dissatisfaction regionally. Harney rejected criticisms from Fine Gael during the same month that there had been a 25% increase in people waiting on trolleys in regional hospitals during the past two years; she claimed Health Service Executive statistics showed otherwise.

In July and August 2006, she issued three orders exempting two new community nursing units, to be built at St. Mary's Hospital in the Phoenix Park, from the usual legal requirement of planning permission, despite the Park being a designated and protected national monument. The Department of Health said the decision was made because of what it called the department's "emergency response to the accident and emergency crisis at the time", although the nursing units, in use since 2008, are mainly for geriatric care.

The same year, in her capacity as Minister for Health, Mary Harney introduced risk equalisation into the Irish healthcare market. This was hugely resisted by BUPA. Despite High Court proceedings, the controversial change was upheld. This forced BUPA out of the Irish healthcare market. (BUPA Ireland was afterwards bought by the Irish-owned Quinn Group, averting any fear of redundancies.) In January 2007 a leaked memo said that the planned Cancer Care Strategy, due for completion in 2011, would not be delivered on time. Harney denied this and said that since the leaking of the memo there had been much progress, although she did not elaborate. The plan was to allow for nationwide radiotherapy services by 2011.

Resignation and return as party leader: 2006–2008
On 7 September 2006, Mary Harney announced that she was resigning as leader of the Progressive Democrats and that she would remain leader until a successor was chosen. She said she wanted to continue as Minister for Health but stated that it was a matter for her successor and the Taoiseach. She was succeeded by then-Justice Minister Michael McDowell after Tom Parlon and backbencher Liz O'Donnell nominated him. Parlon became party president and O'Donnell Deputy Leader in an agreement with McDowell after much speculation that the pair would also seek the leadership.

Following the poor performance of the Progressive Democrats at the 2007 general election, in which the party lost six of its eight seats including that of party leader Michael McDowell, Harney resumed her role as party leader. The Progressive Democrats' rules at the time stipulated that the leader of the party must be a TD, and Harney was one of only two remaining TDs; she resumed the leadership in a caretaker capacity. Following a rule change that broadened the eligibility, she was succeeded by Senator Ciarán Cannon as party leader on 17 April 2008.

Independent TD: 2008–2011
When the Progressive Democrats voted to disband in November 2008, Harney said she would remain as an independent TD once the party was wound up.

Resignation as minister and retirement from Dáil: 2011
On 15 January 2011, Harney tendered her resignation as Minister for Health and Children to Taoiseach Brian Cowen. She also stated that she would not be contesting the 2011 general election.

Criticisms
Alongside her predecessor at the Department of Health, Micheál Martin, and officials at two prominent Dublin fertility clinics, she received a package which included a threatening letter on 29 February 2008.

Councillor Louise Minihan, a member of Dublin City Council, threw red paint over Harney on 1 November 2010 as Harney turned the sod on a new health centre beside the Cherry Orchard Hospital in Ballyfermot. Minihan was detained but later released.

On 12 November 2010, Harney's ministerial car was pelted with eggs and cheese as she arrived in Nenagh, with protesters referring to the "ongoing downgrading of the [local] hospital".

FÁS expenses scandal

In 2004 she travelled to Florida with senior FÁS executives, department officials, and her husband, Brian Geoghegan, and was receiving more than €100-a-day subsistence money from the taxpayer when FÁS picked up her hairdressing bill in a Florida hotel. Like all government ministers travelling abroad, she was entitled to a daily allowance for "incidental expenses".

In a RTÉ Radio 1 interview on 27 November 2008, Fianna Fáil TD Mary O'Rourke described Harney's involvement in the scandal as "a load of hoo-hah".

On 28 November 2008, Harney defended her use of expenses while on a FÁS trip to the US, saying that she was "not on holiday", she had not used public taxes for her own personal grooming, that the use of the government jet for the trip was made by the Taoiseach, and she had followed advice in claiming her expenses. She acknowledged meeting a relative for an hour while in the United States. Labour Party leader Eamon Gilmore told his party conference that Harney should resign because of her performance as Minister for Health.

Libel cases
In 2002, Harney settled a libel case with Magill magazine for around €25,000, and in 2004 she settled a case against the Sunday Independent for €70,000. In May 2011, she received a €450,000 in compensation from Newstalk radio for a slur made about her on live air by journalist Nell McCafferty.

Post-politics

Board memberships
In 2012, Harney joined the board of a new healthcare company, Cara. In her first interview since leaving office, Harney said she joined the boards of two Irish 'high-potential' start-ups, Cara Health and Ward Biotech. She was also employed in speaking engagements, saying: "I spoke at a recent surgeons' conference in New York on my experience as a health minister and in Berlin on the Irish pharma sector." In April 2012 Harney joined the board of car fleet insurer Euro Insurances, an Irish subsidiary of Dutch leasing giant Leaseplan. Indian pharma businessman Kiran Mazumdar-Shaw, appointed Harney to the board of Biocon, a Bangalore-based company employing 7,000 and expanding in Malaysia.

2016 address
On 17 April 2016, Harney intervened in government formation talks, claiming the deadlock would damage "Ireland's reputation" in remarks made during her closing address at the three-day Women in Media conference in Ballybunion. In the same address Harney, who attended with husband Brian Geogheghan, claimed that "when she left public life she made a conscious decision to leave politics behind her".

Recognition
In 2019, Trinity College Dublin awarded Harney an honorary doctorate.

Personal life
In November 2001 Harney married Brian Geoghegan, a businessman, in a low-key afternoon ceremony in Dublin, on a day in which she attended to a number of significant political meetings.

References

External links

1953 births
People from Ballinasloe
Living people
Auditors of the College Historical Society
Alumni of Trinity College Dublin
Politicians from County Galway
Councillors of Dublin County Council
Fianna Fáil TDs
Fianna Fáil senators
Independent TDs
Leaders of Progressive Democrats
Local councillors in South Dublin (county)
Progressive Democrats TDs
Members of the 22nd Dáil
Members of the 23rd Dáil
Members of the 24th Dáil
Members of the 25th Dáil
Members of the 26th Dáil
Members of the 27th Dáil
Members of the 28th Dáil
Members of the 29th Dáil
Members of the 30th Dáil
20th-century women Teachtaí Dála
21st-century women Teachtaí Dála
Members of the 14th Seanad
Nominated members of Seanad Éireann
20th-century women members of Seanad Éireann
Ministers of State of the 26th Dáil
Women government ministers of the Republic of Ireland
Women ministers of state of the Republic of Ireland
Tánaistí
Ministers for Enterprise, Trade and Employment
Ministers for Health (Ireland)
Women opposition leaders
Chancellors of the University of Limerick